Jacques Pieiller is a French actor. In 1980, he starred in Le Voyage en douce under director Michel Deville.

References

External links

Year of birth missing (living people)
Living people
French male film actors